The Northern Nevada 3A Region is a part of the Nevada Interscholastic Activities Association, governing the northern half of Nevada for high school athletics.  The Northern 3A league is the 2nd largest school level, which has schools with enrollments of 461 to 1200. As of the 2018–2019 school year, there are 10 member schools in the Northern 3A league. Elko High School, South Tahoe High School, and Churchill County High School moved down from the Northern 4A beginning the 2010–2011 school year and at the start of the 2018–2019 school year, North Valleys High School moved down from the Northern 4A to the Northern 3A.

Current members

References 

Class Alignment. Nevada Interscholastic Athletics Association (2007-2008). Retrieved on 2008-04-27.
School Directory (PDF). Nevada Interscholastic Athletics Association. Retrieved on 2008-04-27.

Nevada high school sports conferences